Christian Gauseth (born 26 June 1984) is a Norwegian former professional footballer who played as a midfielder. He played for 1. divisjon sides Molde, Bryne, Alta and Mjøndalen.

Club career
Born in Molde, Gauseth joined Molde's first-team squad ahead of the 2007 season. He is well-known throughout the FIFA video game series community for making faces for his card picture.

Career statistics

Club

References

1984 births
Living people
People from Molde
Norwegian footballers
Molde FK players
Bryne FK players
Alta IF players
Mjøndalen IF players
Eliteserien players
Norwegian First Division players
Association football midfielders
Sportspeople from Møre og Romsdal